Oluf Borch de Schouboe (5 June 1777 – 21 December 1844) was the Norwegian civil servant and government official.

Schouboe was born in Bergen, Norway. As the son of Councillor of State Christian de Schouboe (1737-1789) and Anna Magdalena Müller (1751-1785), he belonged to the Norwegian aristocracy. He is the brother of Ulrik Fredrik Anton de Schouboe.

He completed his legal examination at the University of Copenhagen in 1801. He then served as magistrate at Nykøbing Falster and Elsinore. In 1810, he was appointed Governor of Stavanger Amt, a post held until 1812 when he was promoted and appointed to be the Diocesan Governor of Christianssand Stiftamt. This stiftamt was subdivided into several subordinate counties amt. During this time, he also served as governor of some of these subordinate counties as well. First, he served as the Governor of Nedenes Amt from 1812-1815 and then switched roles to be the Governor of Lister og Mandals Amt from 1815-1836. 

He served as Minister of Education and Church Affairs in 1836, 1839–1840, and 1843–1844; Minister of Auditing in 1838–1839 and 1841–1842; Minister of the Army in 1839 and 1842–1843; and member of the Council of State Division in Stockholm in 1837–1838, 1840–1841, and 1844.

References

1777 births
1844 deaths
Civil servants from Bergen
Government ministers of Norway
County governors of Norway
18th-century Norwegian nobility
19th-century Norwegian politicians
University of Copenhagen alumni
Ministers of Education of Norway
Defence ministers of Norway